Netrokona is a major town and District headquarter in Netrokona District in the division of Mymensingh. It is the largest town and urban centre of Netrokona District.

References

Populated places in Mymensingh Division
Towns in Bangladesh